The Harvard Law & Policy Review is a law journal and the official journal of the American Constitution Society, a progressive legal organization. It was established in 2007. The journal publishes two printed editions per year, as well as additional content posted exclusively online. It is edited by Harvard Law School students and typically has a staff of approximately 75 students. The journal publishes articles presenting progressive ideas for law and policy written by legal scholars, policymakers, practitioners, and students. 

The journal is ranked 42 on the Washington & Lee Law Journal Rankings of the top 400 law journals published in the United States and the top 100 law journals published outside the United States, making it the fourth-highest-ranked specialty law journal and the second-highest-ranked specialty law journal at Harvard Law School. 

The Harvard Law & Policy Review should not be confused with the Harvard Journal of Law and Public Policy, a forum for conservative and libertarian legal scholarship that serves as the official journal of the Federalist Society.

Notable contributors

References

American law journals
Publications established in 2007
English-language journals
Biannual journals